In marketing, a corporate anniversary is a celebration of a firm's continued existence after a particular number of years. The celebration is a media event which can help a firm achieve diverse marketing goals, such as promoting its corporate identity, boosting employee morale, building greater investor confidence, and encouraging sales. As a public relations opportunity, it is a way for a firm to tout past accomplishments while strengthening relationships with employees and customers and investors. The duration of the celebration itself can vary considerably, from an hour or day to activities happening throughout the year. Many businesses use an anniversary to express gratitude for past success. Generally, larger corporations have the means to stage more elaborate celebrations.

Characteristics
An anniversary can advertise a firm's staying power and longevity. A report in The New York Times explained the marketing logic:

Marketers choose variables relating to anniversaries to meet specific promotional objectives. While the length of time celebrated by an anniversary is often divisible by five, such as the 10th, 15th, 25th, 50th, or 80th anniversary, there are no hard and fast rules. For example, Google celebrated its 13th anniversary with a special "doodle" for its main search page which showed a colorful image of "cake, presents and balloons." Generally, anniversaries are chosen to coincide with marketing initiatives, such that "any coming of age will do," according to one view. An anniversary can commemorate not only a firm's founding year but the introduction of a successful company brand, a merger, a patent, or some other milestone. There are a wide variety of marketing gimmicks and appeals which can accompany an anniversary celebration: sweepstakes, contests, thank you letters, special product editions, parties, guest speakers, birthday displays on websites, giveaways, new product introductions, publicity stunts, sponsorships, fireworks, live musical performances, commemorative packaging, anniversary rings, promotions, signs in retail stores, donations, scholarships, temporary price reductions or discounts, reflections on past accomplishments, special ad campaigns, new logos, and so on.

Planning
Planning an anniversary can take years. In some cases, special marketing consultants and event planners have been hired to coordinate the effort. Large corporations typically work closely with their corporate advertising agency as well as their marketing and sales departments to plan sometimes elaborate campaigns, often with a special theme to mark the occasion. For example, Starbucks marked their 40th anniversary with a redesigned logo and media campaign. Guinness Brewery celebrated its 250th anniversary with a global advertising effort. In 1972, Time magazine celebrated its 50th anniversary with events throughout the year:

There is flexibility in terms of choosing which dates to use when determining an anniversary. The start date is often the month or year when a firm was founded, but this can vary considerably, and exceptions are the rule; for example, Lego toys celebrated its 50th anniversary in 2008 –– exactly 50 years after the time when the founder's son, Godtfred Kirk Christiansen, filed a patent for the iconic plastic bricks in 1958.

Difficulty in measuring success
Measuring the success of any advertising effort, including an anniversary celebration, can be difficult. Sometimes an anniversary generates negative publicity, such as the tenth anniversary of the merger between AOL and Time Warner, which was largely seen as a colossal business blunder. A report in The Guardian suggested that corporate anniversaries do not always lead to "happy returns":

See also
 Advertising
 Corporate identity
 Event management
 Event planning
 Marketing strategy
 Media event
 Public relations

References

External links
 Anniversary marketing

Public relations
Sales promotion
Anniversaries
Public relations techniques